Abhijit Guha is an Indian film director, actor and writer working in the Tollywood film industry. Guha and Sudeshna Roy have worked together in the field of audio visuals since 1994. The duo debuted with their first film Shudhu Tumi and then they made several films in varied genres. However, they are known to make rom-com urban based films. When it comes to narrating young, urban middle-class romance and relationships stories without going overboard, no one can match steps with director duo Sudeshna Roy and Abhijit Guha. They've given Tollywood one of its biggest stars — Abir Chatterjee, who debuted in their film Cross Connection in 2009. Regardless of the subject, be it about going on a honeymoon before marriage (Cross Connection), voyeurism (Teen Yaari Kotha), or even unrequited love (Jodi Love Dile Na Prane) — all their movies have a fresh and non-preachy approach. They came into prominence after their critically acclaimed film Teen Yaari Kotha. It's a story of personal struggles and friendship of three lower-middle-class men. Teen Yaari Katha was showcased in the competition section of Osian's Cinefan Festival of Asian and Arab Cinema in 2012. It travelled to the Bangkok International Film as well as Kolkata International Film Festival.Their film Bapi bari jaa is considered as cult classic among the Bangla film lovers for its coming of age storyline and relatable characters. It also marked the debut of Arjun Chakraborty and MP Mimi Chakraborty in Bangla film industry.

Their film Jodi Love Dilena Praane was another well received film and was selected in the Indian Panorama section of the International Film Festival of India in Goa in 2014. It was showcased at the Pune Film Festival in India, and won a certificate of appreciation at the Fiji International Film Festival in 2015.

Their film Benche Thakar Gaan : The Song of Life ran in theatres for the nine weeks and was selected as the inaugural film for the Kolkata International Film Festival film Benche Thakar Gaan 2016. This is the first time in history that a Bengali language film was given this honour. Their film Sraboner Dhara is a part of the Asian Select Competition Section KIFF 2019, Kolkata. It was showcased in Toronto at the IFFSA fest in May, 2019. Sraboner Dhara was released on 7 February 2020 in India and was running to full houses on its 6th week when the COVID-19 lockdown cut it short.

Besides, directing films and TV series, he has also acted in many films. Perhaps, he has played small roles almost in all the films that he has directed. His comic timing in those films is impeccable Recently, he has been playing the role of Jibon Da in the extremely popular web series Dupur Thakurpo. His chemistry with the lead actress of the show Swastika Mukherjee is very much loved by the viewers.

Films

Short Film/Web Series

 Virgin Mohito (2018)
 Amra 2GayTher (2021)

Television Series (As Director)

Fiction 

 Labonyor Sansar
 Khunje Berai Kachcher Maanush
 Shashuri Zindabad
 Taranath Tantrik
 Kanakanjali

Non Fiction 

 Manabi
 Parama
 Naari

Quiz Programmes 

 Sreemoti Budhdhimoti
 Proshnokhetro
 Checkmate

Children Programmes 

 Dekhbo Aami Jagat Take

As actor 

 Hatyapuri
 Love Aaj Kal Porshu (2020)
Shantilal O Projapoti Rohoshyo (2019)
Ahare Mon (2018)
Bultir Result (2018)
 Manojder Adbhut Bari (2018)
 Dupur Thakurpo (Web Series) (2017)
 Abar Ekla Cholo (TV Movie) (2016)
Asche Bochor Abar Hobe (2015)
 Obhishopto Nighty (2014)
 Rupkatha Noy (2013)
 Meghe Dhaka Tara (2013)
Shubho Mahurat (2003)

Awards & Recognitions 

Teen Yaari Katha was showcased in the competition section of Osian's Cinefan Festival of Asian and Arab Cinema in 2012. It travelled to the Bangkok International Film as well as Kolkata International Film Festival.
Jodi Love Dile Na Prane was selected for Indian Panorama Film Festival in Goa in 2014. Official selection in Pune Film Festival and Hyderabad Film Festival. It won the Certificate of Appreciation at Fiji International Film Festival in 2015.
Benche Thakar Gaan : The Song of Life was selected as the inaugural film for the Kolkata International Film Festival 2016. 
Sraboner Dhara is a part of the Asian Select Competition Section KIFF 2019, Kolkata. It was showcased in Toronto at the IFFSA fest in May, 2019.

References

External links
 
Chalo Let's Live

Bengali actors
Bengali film directors
Bengali writers
Bengali screenwriters
Living people
1965 births
Film directors from Kolkata
Male actors from Kolkata
Screenwriters from Kolkata